A Day in Copenhagen is an album by saxophonist Dexter Gordon with trombonist Slide Hampton recorded in Copenhagen in 1969 which was originally released on the MPS label in Europe and re-released on the Prestige label in the US.

Reception
Scott Yanow of Allmusic states: "Unlike many other American expatriates living in Europe, tenor saxophonist Dexter Gordon always managed to play and record with the top musicians while overseas... The other soloists are fine but Gordon easily dominates the set, playing his brand of hard-driving bop".

Track listing 
All compositions by Slide Hampton except as indicated
 "My Blues" - 9:11   
 "You Don't Know What Love Is" (Gene de Paul, Don Raye) - 6:03   
 "A New Thing" - 5:07   
 "What's New?" (Bob Haggart) - 8:04   
 "The Shadow of Your Smile" (Johnny Mandel, Paul Francis Webster) - 5:01   
 "A Day in Vienna" - 7:49

Personnel 
Dexter Gordon - tenor saxophone
Slide Hampton - trombone (tracks 1-4 & 6)
Dizzy Reece - trumpet (tracks 1-4 & 6)
Kenny Drew - piano
Niels-Henning Ørsted Pedersen - bass
Art Taylor - drums

References 

1969 albums
Prestige Records albums
MPS Records albums
Slide Hampton albums
Dexter Gordon albums